Martina Stella (born 28 November 1984) is an Italian actress and screenwriter.

Acting career
Stella made her cinematic debut at the age of 16 in 2001 in L'ultimo bacio. The film was a success in Italy, and was nominated for multiple David di Donatello awards, including Best Film.

L'ultimo bacio was released internationally, with the title The Last Kiss for English-speaking audiences. Reviews of Stella's performance as Francesca, a beautiful teenager who seduces Carlo (Stefano Accorsi) a man in a committed relationship,  were generally positive. One American reviewer compared her to "a young Reese Witherspoon", while another described her portrayal in greater depth:

Stella proceeded to build a career as an actress in Italian films, including 2002's Amnèsia, which was directed by past Academy Award-winner Gabriele Salvatores. Her film career has also included a small role in the 2004 Hollywood movie Ocean's Twelve. She studied English for her role in the 2009 Rob Marshall film Nine.

Stella made her theatrical debut in 2002 in Aggiungi un posto a tavola, and briefly returned to the stage in 2006 in Romeo e Giulietta.  Stella has also played lead roles in various Italian television projects, including the miniseries Le ragazze di San Frediano and Piper.

Other media
In July 2014, AMBI Group announced it had optioned the rights to Stella's screenplay O.O.B.I., which in June 2014 won the award for Best Screenplay at the third edition of the Italian Contemporary Film Festival in Toronto.

Stella has been a spokesperson for various commercial products (primarily clothing and cosmetics) and for several charitable causes.

Stella often visits Italian television talk shows to promote her acting projects and interests.  She has also been a prank victim on Italian television's Scherzi a Parte, and she acted in the music video for the song "Eternal woman" by the Belgian band dEUS.

Personal life
Stella began dating hair stylist Gabriele Gregorini in 2011. In May 2012, Stella announced she had become pregnant with Gregorini's child, and on 30 October 2012 their daughter Ginevra was born. In 2014, Stella and Gregorini split.
She married Andrea Manfredonia in 2016, and the couple's son Leonardo was born in November 2021.

Filmography

Cinema

Television

References

External links

Official website

1984 births
Italian actresses
Living people
Film people from Florence
Actors from Florence
People from Impruneta